The Anglican Diocese of Ohaji/Egbema is one of twelve within the Anglican Province of Owerri, itself one of fourteen provinces within the Church of Nigeria: the current bishop is Chidi Collins Oparaojiaku. Oparaojiaku was consecrated a bishop on May 14, 2008 at St James's Cathedral, Oke-Bola, Ibadan; the missionary diocese was inaugurated on June 6 at St Peter's Cathedral, Umuokanne-Ohaji, Imo State.

Notes

Church of Nigeria dioceses
Dioceses of the Province of Owerri